is a Japanese actor.

Filmography

Television
ChouSeiShin GranSazer (TV Tokyo, 2003)
Fight (NHK, 2005)
Walkers (NHK, 2006)
3 Nen B Gumi Kinpachi Sensei 8 (TBS, 2007)
 Hitogata Nagashi (NHK, 2007)
 Fuurin Kazan (NHK, 2007)
 Natsu no Himitsu (Fuji TV, 2009)
 NEXT Koisuru Anri Suiri Naka (KTV, 2009)
Deka Wanko (NTV, 2011, ep5)
Segodon (NHK, 2018), Gotō Shōjirō

Film
 Sekai ha Tokidoki Utsukushii (2007)

References

External links
Official site
Ryo Segawa (@segawa_ryo) - Twitter

Japanese male actors
1978 births
Living people